Bilal Xhaferri Publishing House (BXhPH) , in Albanian: Shtëpia Botuese "Bilal Xhaferri", is the first publishing institution of  the democratic era, after 1990, when the communist dictatorship in Albania collapsed. It is owned by Shefki Hysa.

History 
Bilal Xhaferri Publishing House was established by a group of Albanian writers, journalists and intellectuals who represented the free thought and supported the Albanian and Balkans dissident literature, the American-English literature and the literary and artistic trends that propagated peace and prosperity around the world.  This new publishing institution took the name of the dissident writer Bilal Xhaferri.

Activity 
Bilal Xhaferri Publishing House started the activity of publishing the literary works of the dissident Bilal Xhaferri such as the romance "Bloody Love" and the novel "Krastakraus", a novel which was dedicated to the figure of Skanderbeg. Bilal Xhaferri Publishing House continued its publications with selected works of other Albanian dissident writers such as Pjetër Arbnori, Bilal Xhaferri, Namik Mane and Kasem Trebeshina, and the 
translation and publication of world-known authors like Alfred de Musset, Jean-Paul Sartre, Edgar Allan Poe, Jack London, W. Somerset Maugham, Katherine Mansfield, Christina Rossetti, etc.
In collaboration with organizations Albania such as Albanian League of Writers and Artists, and Bilal Xhaferri Cultural Association, and international organizations such as Diplomatic Mission Peace and Prosperity, Bilal Xhaferri Publishing House has published and continues to publish in Albanian and English also works of the activists of the protection of human rights and peace missionaries who have been devoted to the peace and prosperity in the Balkans and around the world. Bilal Xhaferri Publishing House publishes also the magazine "Krahu i Shqiponjës" (English: Eagle's Wing), a bilingual magazine in Albanian and English published since 1 October 1974 in  United States, Chicago, by Bilal Xhaferri.

See also
 Albanian literature
 Bilal Xhaferri Cultural Association
 Bilal Xhaferri

References

External links 
 Homepage of DMPP
 Homepage of B.Xh.P.H.

Publishing companies established in 1992
Publishing companies of Albania
Albanian literature